Ganigan may refer to:
 Andrew Ganigan (1952-2012), American boxer
 Ganigan López (born 1981), Mexican boxer